Douglas Wakiihuri (born September 26, 1963, in Mombasa) is a former Kenyan long-distance runner, who won the gold medal in the marathon at the 1987 World Championships in Athletics in Rome.

No other male Kenyan runner had ever won the marathon at World Championships or Olympic Games until 2007, when Luke Kibet became a world champion. The following year, Wakiihuri won the silver medal at the 1988 Summer Olympics in Seoul, finishing behind Gelindo Bordin.

In 1989 Wakiihuri won the London Marathon. In 1990 he won the New York Marathon. Wakiihuri was famous for wearing white gloves during races. He now runs a marathon fitness center and training school.

Competitions

References

1963 births
Living people
Sportspeople from Mombasa
Kenyan male long-distance runners
Kenyan male marathon runners
Olympic male marathon runners
Olympic athletes of Kenya
Olympic silver medalists for Kenya
Olympic silver medalists in athletics (track and field)
Athletes (track and field) at the 1988 Summer Olympics
Athletes (track and field) at the 1992 Summer Olympics
Medalists at the 1988 Summer Olympics
Commonwealth Games gold medallists for Kenya
Commonwealth Games gold medallists in athletics
Athletes (track and field) at the 1990 Commonwealth Games
World Athletics Championships athletes for Kenya
World Athletics Championships medalists
World Athletics Championships winners
Japan Championships in Athletics winners
London Marathon male winners
New York City Marathon male winners
Commonwealth Games competitors for Kenya
Medallists at the 1990 Commonwealth Games